A pressure sewer  provides a method of discharging sewage from properties into a conventional gravity sewer or directly to a sewage treatment plant.
Pressure sewers are typically used where properties are located below the level of the nearest gravity sewer or are located on difficult terrain.

Operation
In a typical set-up, a receiving well is provided close to the properties being served so that all sewage can gravitate to the well. An electric macerator pump (also called a grinder pump) pumps the finely macerated sewage  through a narrow diameter continuous plastic pipe which discharges into the nearest gravity sewer or treatment plant. The operation of the pump is controlled by a float switch in the pumping well. The pumping well is sized to allow for periods of power outage or pump maintenance.
The discharge pipe may be as small as 25mm diameter carrying sewage at very high flow rates. 

Pressure sewers are also used to collect the discharge from septic tanks and discharge this into the local gravity sewer to protect local ground water from contamination

Advantages
Pressure mains enable properties constructed below the nearest gravity main to connect to the local sewerage system avoiding the need for a septic tank or cesspit.

In areas where washouts or earthquakes are common, conventional earthenware or cast iron sewerage system may be prone to breakage and leakage. the small diameter plastic discharge pipe of a pressure system is much more robust and can accommodate substantial movements in the ground without failing.

Costs can be lower than conventional sewers since the pipework is much cheaper and there is no requirement for manholes or other intermediate infrastructure. Installation costs can also be very low as the pipes can be laid very close to the surface and may be installed using no-dig methods such as moleing

Disadvantages
The pumping well and pump controls require expert maintenance and repair should they fail.
Electricity is required to power the pump and this cost would typically fall on the local house-holder.
Although the pump well is usually designed to accommodate several days storage, failure of the pump or of the local electricity supply for an extended period would result in a local overflow.

References

Hydraulic engineering
Sewerage infrastructure